184 (one hundred [and] eighty-four) is the natural number following 183 and preceding 185.

In mathematics
There are 184 different Eulerian graphs on eight unlabeled vertices, and 184 paths by which a chess rook can travel from one corner of a 4 × 4 chessboard to the opposite corner without passing through the same square twice. 184 is also a refactorable number.

In other fields
Some physicists have proposed that 184 is a magic number for neutrons in atomic nuclei.

In poker, with one or more jokers as wild cards, there are 184 different straight flushes.

See also
 The year AD 184 or 184 BC
 List of highways numbered 184

References

Integers